Jeffery Lee Johnson Jr. (born April 2, 1990), better known by his stage name Roscoe Dash, is an American rapper, singer, and songwriter. He is best known for his debut single "All the Way Turnt Up" (featuring Soulja Boy), which peaked at number 46 on the Billboard Hot 100 in January 2010. He is also known for featuring alongside Wale on Waka Flocka Flame 's "No Hands" the same year, and alongside Kanye West on Big Sean's "Marvin & Chardonnay" in 2011, both reaching 13 and 32 respectively on the Hot 100. Johnson also has numerous accolades as a songwriter, ghostwriting for various names in the industry.

Career

2002–2009: Career beginnings 
Johnson started rapping when was at the age of 12, after his older brother introduced him to hip-hop. While attending in high school, he and his brother created a rap group, which consisted of four artists, who went by the name of Black Out Boiz (aka B.O.B.), where his original stage name ATL came from. Though the group has been receiving positive feedback, ATL would eventually leave B.O.B. (Black Out Boiz) and get started in his pursuit of a solo career. He continued recording in his basement and making mixtapes, this hard work led to Jeffrey Johnson going into a meeting with sponsor of the local rap group, who called themselves Travis Porter. He attended Mill Creek High School.

Johnson knew he had to create a new identity to start his music career. He googled names of comic book heroes, and came across the name as Roscoe Dash. Johnson says, "I needed something more marketable. I needed something that would catch the ears and eyes of whoever was listening or reading the name Roscoe Dash and make them want to do research on Roscoe Dash." Roscoe Dash released a song, called "All the Way Turnt Up" featuring Travis Porter, while the group released their mixtape, titled I'm a Differenter 2. However, Dash was only credited as a featured artist.

According to Porter, this was just a mistake. He then met local entrepreneur LA da Boomman in 2009, who then signed him to his production company, Making Moves Inc. (MMI). Dash later agreed deals with both Music Line Group after Boomman introduced Dash to the A&R representative Anthony Tate, and Interscope Records distributed Zone 4 after Tate and Dash spoke with music producer Polow da Don, who was the label's founder.

2010–2013: Ready Set Go! and J.U.I.C.E. 
Shortly after its original release, Dash re-recorded the track, called "All the Way Turnt Up", featuring a added guest verse from fellow Atlanta-native rapper Soulja Boy. After that version of the song had turned into a radio hit, Dash signed with Interscope Records within the following year. Dash started recording his debut studio album, titled Ready Set Go!, but it was leaked and shipped before the official release date. The following year, Dash was featured on the chart topping single, called "No Hands" by a fellow Atlanta-native rapper Waka Flocka Flame, alongside a Washington D.C. rapper Wale, making the song itself to become a three-time platinum, and earned all three rappers the "Club Banger of the Year" at the 2011's BET Hip Hop Awards, while Dash received a nomination at the ASCAP Music Awards in 2011.

In 2011, Dash released his first extended play (EP), titled J.U.I.C.E.. Dash also appeared on Big Sean's hit single, called "Marvin & Chardonnay", in which the song went on to be certified Gold. In 2012, Dash was featured on the cover of XXL magazine, as part of their annual "Top 10 Freshmen list", along with these fellow rappers; including Iggy Azalea, Danny Brown, Kid Ink, Future, Hopsin, Macklemore, French Montana, Don Trip and Machine Gun Kelly.

2014–present: Mixtapes 
On August 29, 2014, Dash released his mixtape, titled The Appetizer hosted by DJ Fly Guy. In June 2015, Dash released the track, called "Catch A Body", in which is currently off of his upcoming studio album, titled Dash Effect 2, under new booking management and is seeking a major comeback after his last few years of silence. In March 2016, Dash released a new mixtape, titled Glitch presented and hosted by his then DJ, DJ Fly Guy.

Claims of uncredited songwriting 
On September 20, 2012, Dash claimed via Twitter that he was an uncredited songwriter on G.O.O.D. Music's Cruel Summer album and Wale's song "Lotus Flower Bomb" with Miguel. Wale responded "Nighas be wellin on twitter", while Miguel responded in a statement to Complex, saying, "As far as I know, Wale and another artist that I recently met penned the original 'Lotus Flower Bomb' chorus and I came in and added the second half or the end part of the chorus [...] Twitter is definitely not the place to handle business per say. If he wanted to get that rectified, he would have his lawyer contact the proper people."

Discography 

 Ready Set Go! (2010)

Awards and nominations

BET Hip Hop Awards 

|-
| rowspan="2" | 2011–2020
| rowspan="2" | "No Hands"
| Best Collaboration
| 
|-
| Best Club Banger
| 
|-

References

External links 
 

1990 births
African-American crunk musicians
African-American male rappers
American hip hop singers
Interscope Records artists
Living people
Rappers from Atlanta
Rappers from Georgia (U.S. state)
Southern hip hop musicians
Place of birth missing (living people)
Pop rappers
Songwriters from Georgia (U.S. state)
21st-century American rappers
21st-century African-American male singers
African-American male singer-songwriters
Def Jam Recordings artists
Geffen Records artists